The Tino Rangatiratanga flag, also known as the national Māori flag, is used to represent the Māori people of New Zealand. In 2009, the Tino Rangatiratanga flag (also simply Tino) was selected as the national Māori flag after a nationwide consultation. It was first revealed on Waitangi Day in 1990. Though it does not have official status from the New Zealand Government, it has been used by the government on official occasions.

Description 
The national Māori flag uses the national colours of New Zealand: black, red ochre, and white or silver. Each of the colours references a realm in the creation story of Māori mythology: black is Te Korekore (potential being), red is Te Whai Ao (coming into being), and white is Te Ao Mārama (the realm of being and light). The design features a koru (Māori for fern frond), a common design in Māori tattoo and sculpture. It symbolises renewal and hope for the future. The white part of the flag is also a reference to the Māori name for New Zealand, Aotearoa, or "Land of the Long White Cloud."

History

Creation 
In 1989, the New Zealand government was preparing to celebrate the 150th anniversary of the signing of the Treaty of Waitangi, a historical document between the British colonial government and the indigenous Māori people. In response to this celebration, several Māori independence organizations, including Te Kawariki, sought to raise awareness of the ways in which the treaty had been breached. Te Kawariki, inspired by the Australian Aboriginal Flag, decided to hold a public contest for a design. However, they did not feel any of the contest submissions fitted what they were looking for, artist Hiraina Marsden created her design, that was later sewed by Jan Smith, and Linda Munn and others of Te Kawariki. The artists consulted local Māori in a hui, Jan smith and other members of Te Kawariki sewed the first Māori flag. The flag was first revealed to the public on 6 February, Waitangi Day, 1990. It quickly gained popularity among Māori.

Use and recognition 
An indigenous rights advocacy group, Te Ata Tino Toa, applied for the national Māori flag to fly on the Auckland Harbour Bridge on Waitangi Day beginning in 2008. Initially, Transit New Zealand, the government agency that was responsible for the bridge, declined on the basis that the flag did not represent a country recognised by the United Nations. After campaigning with a number of tactics, including lobbying Transit New Zealand and Parliament, submissions to the Human Rights Commission, and holding an annual 'Fly the Flag' competition, the government agreed to fly a Māori flag provided that there was a consensus on which one to fly. A Māori Party–led promotion and series of hui led to 1,200 submissions, with 80% of participants in favor of the Tino Rangatiratanga flag as the preferred Māori flag.

On 14 December 2009, Prime Minister John Key and Māori Affairs Minister Pita Sharples announced the flag would fly from the Auckland Harbour Bridge and other official buildings (such as Premier House) on Waitangi Day. Key explained that it would not replace the New Zealand flag but would fly alongside it, in recognition of the partnership between the Crown and the Māori since the Treaty of Waitangi, stating: "No changes are being made to the status of the New Zealand flag". The move was met with some criticism, with Monarchy New Zealand describing the move as "potentially divisive", to which Key responded that it symbolised unity and improving race relations.

In the 2015–2016 New Zealand flag referendums, organisers approached the Tino Rangatiratanga flag designers about the possibility of including it as a candidate for a national flag, but the designers declined.

Other Māori flags

New Zealand National Flag 

The government of New Zealand continues to recognise the flag of New Zealand as the national symbol of both Māori and non-Māori citizens. According to the Ministry for Cultural Heritage, Tino Rangatiratanga should be flown in a way that "respects the status of the New Zealand flag as the symbol of the Realm, Government and people of New Zealand." When flying from different flag poles, protocol dictates the flags may be the same height. When flying from the same flag pole, the New Zealand national flag must fly on top. It was one of the three other flags considered in the public hui in 2009, along with the United Tribes of New Zealand flag and the Red Ensign. Combined, the three received fewer than a fifth of the public votes.

United Tribes of New Zealand Flag 

The flag of the United Tribes of New Zealand (Māori: Te Kara) is a flag selected by a confederation of Māori leaders on 20 March 1834 from among three designs created by British missionary Henry Williams. At the time it was selected, New Zealand was not a colony of the British crown and it was considered the flag of New Zealand. Only later, when the nation became a British colony and the Union Jack its official flag, did this flag become known as the flag of the United Tribes. Though it received few votes in the 2009 hui to select a flag, it had support from a few vocal Māori leaders.

Red Ensign 

The Red Ensign is a variant of the New Zealand national flag initially created for use by merchant vessels. Historically Māori have preferred this variant, often flying it rather than the blue ensign at places and occasions of particular Māori significance, and often defacing it with names or symbols of their social groups. The Flags, Emblems, and Names Protection Act of 1981 grants Māori the leave to continue this tradition. It was one of the four flags put to vote in the 2009 public hui.

Kotahitanga flag 
A kotahitanga flag is one of any flag designs associated with kotahitanga (English: oneness), a term associated with movements for Māori self-governance beginning in the 1830s. Flags for the movement began appearing in the 1980s and were flown at demonstrations, particularly on Waitangi Day. The most common flag was designed by Norman Te Whata and features a circle, off-centre to hoist, with a mere crossed by a scroll representing the Treaty of Waitangi, with the word "Kotahitanga" above it.

Bastion Point Flag 

The Bastion Point flag is a protest flag created by Māori demonstrators to protest the British Crown's occupation of Bastion Point (Māori:Takaparawha) in Auckland, New Zealand. The flag was used in 1977 during the 506 day occupation of the land. It features a mangopare (hammerhead shark) design, representing tenacity. The white of the design references the purity of Ngāti Whātua Ōrākei, the hapū, or sub-tribe, behind the movement. The flag was designed by politician Joe Hawke. It has since been used to memorialise the event and represent other Māori struggles for independence and equality.

See also 
 Māori protest movement
 List of New Zealand flags

References 

 
New Zealand
National symbols of New Zealand
Māori flags